Inward may refer to:

 Avera and Inward, feudal services
Direct Inward Dialing, also called Direct Dial-In (DDI) in Europe and Australasia
Inward Bound (IB), running competition between the residential halls and colleges of the Australian National University
Inward investment, the injection of money from an external source into a region
Inward Parts, the second album by the English band The Others
Inward-rectifier potassium ion channel (Kir, IRK), a specific subset of potassium selective ion channels
North England Inward Investment Agency, UK government sponsored agency